Jana Kuťková (born February 14, 1951 in Bratislava) is a former Czechoslovak/Slovak handball player who competed in the 1980 Summer Olympics.

In 1980 she was part of the Czechoslovak team which finished fifth in the Olympic tournament. She played all five matches and scored 22 goals.

References

1951 births
Living people
Czechoslovak female handball players
Slovak female handball players
Olympic handball players of Czechoslovakia
Handball players at the 1980 Summer Olympics
Sportspeople from Bratislava